Del squared may refer to:

 Laplace operator, a differential operator often denoted by the symbol ∇2
 Hessian matrix, sometimes denoted by ∇2
 Aitken's delta-squared process, a numerical analysis technique used for accelerating the rate of convergence of a sequence

See also 
 DEL2, the second tier ice hockey league in Germany
 Del, a vector calculus differential operator
 Nabla symbol, the symbol used for the Del operator
 ∂, the partial derivative operator symbol 
 Del (disambiguation)